Sarnoff is a surname which may refer to:
Dan Sarnoff(born c.1956),
Ann Sarnoff (born c. 1962), American businesswoman
Arthur Sarnoff (1912–2000), American artist
David Sarnoff (1891–1971), Belarusian-born American radio and television technology pioneer and businessman
Dorothy Sarnoff (1914–2008), American operatic soprano, musical theatre actress and image consultant
Elizabeth Sarnoff, American television writer and producer
Robert W. Sarnoff, American businessman
Sarnoff A. Mednick (1928–2015)
Stanley Sarnoff (died 1990), surgeon and inventor of medical devices

Jewish surnames